Dumitru Frăţilă (March 6, 1926 – 1988) was a Romanian alpine skier and cross-country skier who competed in the 1950s. He finished 24th in the 50 km event at the 1952 Winter Olympics in Oslo.

He was born in Predeal.

External links
Olympic 50 km cross country skiing results: 1948-64

1926 births
1988 deaths
Romanian male alpine skiers
Romanian male cross-country skiers
Olympic alpine skiers of Romania
Olympic cross-country skiers of Romania
Alpine skiers at the 1948 Winter Olympics
Cross-country skiers at the 1952 Winter Olympics
People from Predeal